Joe John Gatto (born June 14, 1995) is an American professional baseball pitcher who is currently a free agent.

Amateur career
Gatto attended St. Augustine College Preparatory School in Richland, New Jersey, and pitched for the school's baseball team.

Professional career

Los Angeles Angels
The Los Angeles Angels selected him in the second round of the 2014 MLB draft and he signed with the Angels, receiving a $1.2 million signing bonus. Gatto split his professional debut season of 2014 between the AZL Angels and the Orem Owlz, going a combined 2–1 with a 5.33 ERA and 16 strikeouts over 27 innings. He spent the 2015 season with Orem, going 2–3 with a 4.31 ERA and 38 strikeouts over  innings. Gatto spent the 2016 season with the Burlington Bees, going 3–8 with a 7.03 ERA and 54 strikeouts over 64 innings. Gatto split the 2017 season between Burlington and the Inland Empire 66ers, going a combined 8–9 with a 3.43 ERA and 101 strikeouts over  innings. He split the 2018 season between Inland Empire and the Mobile BayBears, going a combined 8–6 with a 5.18 ERA and 100 strikeouts over 120 innings. He spent the 2019 season with Mobile, going 5–4 with a 4.80 ERA and 57 strikeouts over  innings. He became a free agent following the pandemic canceled 2020 season.

Texas Rangers
On December 3, 2020, Gatto signed a major league contract with the Texas Rangers. On March 22, 2021, Gatto was outrighted off of the 40-man roster. Gatto split the 2021 season between the Frisco RoughRiders of the Double-A Central and the Round Rock Express of the Triple-A West, going a combined 5–3 with a 3.32 ERA and 69 strikeouts over  innings. Gatto became a free agent following the season.

Philadelphia Phillies
On December 14, 2021, Gatto signed a minor league contract with the Philadelphia Phillies. He was released on July 24, 2022.

References

External links

1995 births
Living people
Baseball players from New Jersey
Baseball pitchers
Minor league baseball players
Arizona League Angels players
Orem Owlz players
Burlington Bees players
Inland Empire 66ers of San Bernardino players
Mobile BayBears players
Frisco RoughRiders players
Round Rock Express players
People from Hammonton, New Jersey
Sportspeople from Atlantic County, New Jersey
St. Augustine Preparatory School alumni